The invasions of Assam by Islamic rulers began in 1206 when the Turko-Afghan Muhammad-i-Bakhtiyar passed through Kamarupa against Tibet. The last attempt was the Battle of Saraighat in 1671 under Mughal emperor Aurangzeb.  The Ahom kingdom removed the vestigial Mughal power from Western Assam up to the Manas river in 1682 after the Battle of Itakhuli.

Notes

References

 

History of Assam
Medieval India
1206 in Asia